Antoni Pacyfik Dydycz O.F.M. Cap. (August 24, 1938) is a prelate of the Roman Catholic Church. He served as bishop of Drohiczyn from 1994 to 2014.

Life 
Born in Serpelice, Dydycz became a member of the Order of Friars Minor Capuchin. He was ordained to the priesthood on June 29, 1963.

On June 20, 1994, he was appointed bishop of Drohiczyn. Dydycz received his episcopal consecration on the following July 10 from Józef Kowalczyk, nuncio for Poland, with archbishop  of Białystok, Stanislaw Szymecki, and archbishop emeritus of Camerino-San Severino Marche, Francesco Gioia, serving as co-consecrators.

On March 29, 2014 his resignation was accepted upon reaching the age of 75 years.

External links 
 
 catholic-hierarchy.org, Bishop Antoni Pacyfik Dydycz

1938 births
People from Łosice County
20th-century Roman Catholic bishops in Poland
21st-century Roman Catholic bishops in Poland
Living people
Capuchin bishops